The Extraordinary and Plenipotentiary Ambassador of Peru to the United Mexican States is the official representative of the Republic of Peru to the United Mexican States.

Historically, both nations were host to great indigenous cultures; the Aztecs and Mayas in Mexico and the Incas in Peru. During colonization, both nations were part of the Spanish Empire until the early 19th century. Mexico was part of Viceroyalty of New Spain while Peru was part of the Viceroyalty of Peru. Diplomatic relations between Mexico and Peru were established on March 3, 1823. On the same date, the first Peruvian ambassador to Mexico presented his credentials to Emperor Agustín de Itúrbide. This was two years after Peru gained its independence from Spain. In October 1892, Mexico opened its first consulate in Lima followed by the opening of an embassy on 14 June 1937. Peru inaugurated an embassy on January 17, 1966.

Relations between both countries have been continuous and amicable, with one exception in 1932, when a letter written by Víctor Raúl Haya de la Torre (at the time exiled in Mexico) was published in the Peruvian press, having been delivered to Lima via a Mexican diplomatic pouch. The event caused Peru to sever its relations with Mexico, only reestablishing them on May 23 of the following year with the mediation of Spain. Despite the souring of relations due to Mexico's role in the 2022 political crisis in Peru, neither Mexico nor Peru have severed relations despite the latter's declaration of Mexican ambassador to Peru, Pablo Monroy Conesa, as a persona non grata as well as the declaration of an ultimatum for him to leave the country.

List of representatives

References

Mexico
Peru